The Girl in the Taxi is a 1921 American silent comedy film directed by Lloyd Ingraham and starring Flora Parker DeHaven, Carter DeHaven, King Baggot, Grace Cunard, and Otis Harlan. It is based on the 1912 English-language adaptation of German play by Frederick Fenn and Arthur Wimperis. The film was released by Associated First National Pictures in April 1921.

Cast
Flora Parker DeHaven as Mignon Smith (as Mrs. Carter De Haven)
Carter DeHaven as Bertie Stewart
King Baggot as Maj. Frederick Smith
Grace Cunard as Marietta
Otis Harlan as Alexis
Tom McGuire as John Stewart
Margaret Campbell as Clara Stewart
Lincoln Plumer as Percy Peters
Freya Sterling as Mary Peters
John Gough as Dr. Paul

Preservation
A copy of The Girl in the Taxi survives in BFI National Archive.

References

External links

1921 comedy films
American drama films
1921 films
American silent feature films
American black-and-white films
First National Pictures films
1920s American films
Silent American drama films